Nottam is a 2006 Malayalam film starring Ajir Shujahi, Arun, Nedumudi Venu, Jagathi Sreekumar and Samvrutha Sunil in the lead roles. The film has been directed by Sasi Paravoor and written by Salin Mankuzhy.

Plot
Vasudeva Chakyar is a well known Koodiyattam artist. Aby George, a friend of his son Vishnu, comes home to see him. Chakyar initially denied Aby's desire to shoot Koodiyattam but later agreed. Later, Vasudeva Chakyar got several venues to perform Koodiyattam in India and abroad.

Cast

Crew 
The film has been directed  by Sasi Paravoor and written by Salin mankuzhy, produced by the banner Film Focus. Cinematography is by K. G. Jayan and Venugopal is in charge of the editing.

Soundtrack

Awards

Kerala State Film Awards-2005

References

2006 films
2000s Malayalam-language films
Films scored by M. Jayachandran
Films shot in Kannur